Marginatum, a Latin adjective meaning having a distinct margin (marginated), may refer to:
 Erythema marginatum, pink rings on the trunk and inner surfaces of the limbs which come and go for as long as several months
 Keratoacanthoma centrifugum marginatum, a cutaneous condition characterized by multiple tumors growing in a localized area